The backbone is the vertebral column of a vertebrate.

Arts, entertainment, and media

Film
 Backbone (1923 film), a 1923 lost silent film starring Alfred Lunt
 Backbone (1975 film), a 1975 Yugoslavian drama directed by Vlatko Gilić

Music

Albums
 Backbones (album), a 2004 Wishbone Ash compilation album
 Backbone (Backbone album), 1998
 Backbone (Boney James album), 1993
 Backbone (Roam album), 2016
 Backbone (Anthony Callea album), 2016
 Backbone (Status Quo album), 2019

Songs
 "At the End of the Day / Backbone", 1993 song by Baby Animals
 "Backbone", 2005 song by Gojira from the album From Mars to Sirius
 "Backbone" (Daughtry song), 2018 song by American rock band Daughtry

Other music
 Backbone, a rock band led by former Grateful Dead drummer Bill Kreutzmann

Other arts, entertainment, and media
 Backbone (solitaire), a solitaire game
 Backbone (magazine), a Canadian business magazine
 Backbone One (gaming device), a hardware and software platform
  Backbone (video game), a 2021 indie video game
 Backbone Entertainment, a video game development company

Places
 Backbone, Virginia, US
 European backbone, or "Blue Banana", a geographic corridor of urbanisation in Western Europe 
 Backbone State Park, oldest state park in Iowa, US

Science and technology
 Backbone chain, in polymer chemistry, the framework of the molecule
 Backbone network, the top level of a hierarchical computer network
 Internet backbone, principal data routes between interconnected networks and core routers in the Internet
 Backbone.js, a JavaScript library used to build applications

Other uses
 Backbone (British radio communications network)

See also